Arianna Hunsicker (born 8 August 2003) is a Canadian Paralympic swimmer who competes in international level events. She was born with a partial left hand.

She won five bronze medals at the 2019 Parapan American Games.

References

External links
 
 

2003 births
Living people
Sportspeople from Surrey, British Columbia
Paralympic swimmers of Canada
Medalists at the 2019 Parapan American Games